The 59th Cannes Film Festival was held from 17 to 28 May 2006. Twenty films from eleven countries were in competition for the Palme d'Or. The President of the Official selection Jury was Wong Kar-wai, the first Chinese director to preside over the jury.

English director Ken Loach won the Palme d'Or with his movie The Wind That Shakes the Barley. Other winners were Pedro Almodóvar (Best Screenplay, Volver) and Alejandro González Iñárritu (Best Director, Babel). This also marked the first time in three years that no American film, actor, actress, or filmmaker won any awards in Cannes.

The festival opened with the premiere screening of The Da Vinci Code, based on the novel by Dan Brown. Transylvania by Tony Gatlif closed the festival. Paris, je t'aime opened the Un Certain Regard section of the festival.

Juries

Main competition
The following people were appointed as the jury for the feature films of the 2006 Main Competition:
Wong Kar-wai (Hong Kong) Jury President 
Helena Bonham Carter (UK)
Monica Bellucci (Italy)
Samuel L. Jackson (USA)
Patrice Leconte (France)
Lucrecia Martel (Argentina)
Tim Roth (UK)
Elia Suleiman (Palestine)
Zhang Ziyi (China)

Un Certain Regard
The following people were appointed as the jury of the 2006 Un Certain Regard:
Monte Hellman (director) (USA) President
Jean-Pierre Lavoignat (critic) (France)
Lars-Olav Beier (critic) (Germany)
Laura Winters (critic) (USA)
Marjane Satrapi (author) (Iran)
Maurizio Cabonat (critic) (Italy)

Cinéfondation and short films
The following people were appointed as the jury of the Cinéfondation and short films competition:
Andrei Konchalovsky (director) (Russia) President
Daniel Brühl (actor) (Germany)
Sandrine Bonnaire (actress) (France)
Souleymane Cissé (director) (Mali)
Tim Burton (director) (United States)
Zbigniew Preisner (composer) (Poland)

Camera d'Or
The following people were appointed as the jury of the 2006 Camera d'Or:
Luc and Jean-Pierre Dardenne (directors) (Belgium) Presidents
Alain Riou (critic) (France)
Frédéric Maire (president of Locarno Festival) (Switzerland)
Jean-Paul Salomé (director) (France)
Jean-Louis Vialard (cinematographer) (France)
Jean-Pierre Neyrac (technician) (France)
Luiz Carlos Merten (critic) (Brazil)
Natacha Laurent (director of the cinémathèque of Toulouse) (France)

Official selection

In competition – Feature films
The following feature films competed for the Palme d'Or: The Palme d'Or winner has been highlighted.

Un Certain Regard
The following films were selected for the competition of Un Certain Regard:

2:37 by Murali K. Thalluri
977 by Nikolay Khomeriki
Bled Number One by Rabah Ameur-Zaïmeche
French California (La Californie) by Jacques Fieschi
Luxury Car by Wang Chao
Murderers (Meurtrières) by Patrick Grandperret
The Page Turner (La Tourneuse de pages) by Denis Dercourt
Paraguayan Hammock (Hamaca paraguaya) by Paz Encina
Paris, je t'aime by Gurinder Chadha, Bruno Podalydès, Gus Van Sant, Coen brothers, Walter Salles, Daniela Thomas, Christopher Doyle, Isabel Coixet, Suwa Nobuhiro, Sylvain Chomet, Alfonso Cuarón, Olivier Assayas, Oliver Schmitz, Richard LaGravenese, Vincenzo Natali, Wes Craven, Tom Tykwer, Gérard Depardieu, Frédéric Auburtin, Alexander Payne
Re-cycle (Gwaï wik) by Oxide Pang & Danny Pang
Retrieval (Z odzysku) by Sławomir Fabicki
Salvador by Manuel Huerga
A Scanner Darkly by Richard Linklater
Serambi by Garin Nugroho, Tonny Trimarsanto, Viva Westi, Lianto Luseno
Suburban Mayhem by Paul Goldman
Taxidermia by György Pálfi
Ten Canoes by Rolf de Heer
To Get to Heaven, First You Have to Die (Bihisht faqat baroi murdagon) by Jamshed Usmonov
The Unforgiven (Yongseobadji mothan ja) by Yoon Jong-bin
Uro by Stefan Faldbakken
The Violin (El violin) by Francisco Vargas
The Way I Spent the End of the World (Cum mi-am petrecut sfârşitul lumii) by Cătălin Mitulescu
The Wedding Director (Il regista di matrimoni) by Marco Bellocchio
You Am I by Kristijonas Vildziunas

Films out of competition
The following films were selected to be screened out of competition:

An Inconvenient Truth by Davis Guggenheim
Avida by Benoît Delépine
Bamako by Abderrahmane Sissako
Boffo! Tinseltown's Bombs and Blockbusters by Bill Couturié
The Boy on the Galloping Horse (Chlopiec na galopujacym koniu) by Adam Guziński
Clerks II by Kevin Smith
A Curtain Raiser (Un lever de rideau) by François Ozon
The Da Vinci Code by Ron Howard
El-banate dol by Tahani Rached
Election 2 by Johnnie To
Halim by Sherif Arafa
The House Is Burning by Holger Ernst
I Only Wanted to Live (Volevo solo vivere) by Mimmo Calopresti
Ici Najac, à vous la terre by Jean-Henri Meunier
Nouvelle chance by Anne Fontaine
Over the Hedge by Tim Johnson, Karey Kirkpatrick
Requiem for Billy the Kid by Anne Feinsilber
Room 666 (Chambre 666) by Wim Wenders
Les signes by Eugène Green
Shortbus by John Cameron Mitchell
SIDA by Gaspar Noé
Silk by Su Chao-pin
Sketches of Frank Gehry by Sydney Pollack
Stanley's Girlfriend by Monte Hellman
Transylvania by Tony Gatlif
United 93 by Paul Greengrass
The Water Diary by Jane Campion
X-Men: The Last Stand by Brett Ratner
Zidane: A 21st Century Portrait (Zidane, un portrait du 21e siècle) by Philippe Parreno and Douglas Gordon

Cinéfondation
The following short films were selected for the competition of Cinéfondation:

Doorman by Etienne Kallos
Een ingewikkeld verhaal, eenvoudig verteld by Jaap van Heusden
Elastinen parturi by Milla Nybondas
Emile's Girlfriend (Ha'chavera shell Emile) by Nadav Lapid
Even Kids Started Small by Yaniv Berman
Firn by Axel Koenzen
Ge & Zeta by Gustavo Riet
Une goutte d'eau by Deniz Gamze Ergüven
Graceland by Anocha Suwichakornpong
Hunde by Matthias Huser
Jaba by Andreas Bolm
Justiça ao insulto by Bruno Jorge
Mother by Siân Heder
Mr. Schwartz, Mr. Hazen & Mr. Horlocker by Stefan Mueller
Snow by Dustin Feneley
Tetris by Anirban Datta
Le virus by Ágnes Kocsis

Short film competition
The following short films competed for the Short Film Palme d'Or:

Banquise by Cédric Louis, Claude Barras
Conte de quartier by Florence Miailhe
Film noir by Osbert Parker
Nature's Way by Jane Shearer
O monstro by Eduardo Valente
Ongeriewe by Robin Kleinsmidt
Poyraz by Belma Bas
Primera nieve by Pablo Aguero
Sexy Thing by Denie Pentecost
Sniffer by Bobbie Peers

Cannes Classics
The Cannes Classics section highlights heritage cinema, re-discovered films, restored prints and theatrical, television or DVD releases of great films of the past.

Tribute
India Song by Marguerite Duras (1975)
Sergei Eisenstein
Hommage A Sergei Eisensten (02:17)
Bezhin Meadow (Bejin lug) by Sergei Eisenstein (1936 short)
Alejandro Jodorowsky
The Holy Mountain (1973)
El Topo (1970)
Carol Reed
A Kid for Two Farthings (1955)
The Fallen Idol (1948)
Odd Man Out (1947)
The Way Ahead (1944)
Seance John Ford / John Wayne (03:22)
Norman McLaren
Programme McLaren (01:30)
Norman McLaren's Opening Speech with Arthur Lipset (1961 short)
Begone Dull Care (1949 short) with Evelyn Lambart
Blinkity Blank (1955 short)
A Chairy Tale (1957 short) with Claude Jutra
Hen Hop (1942 short)
Lines horizontal (1962 short) with Evelyn Lambart
Mail Early (1941 short)
Le merle (1958 short)
Neighbours (1952 short)
Pas de deux (1968 short)
La poulette grise (1947 short)
Stars and Stripes (1940 short)
Synchromy (1971 short)

Documentaries about Cinema

Il était une fois...Rome ville ouverte by Marie Genin, Serge July
John Ford / John Wayne: The Filmmaker and the Legend by Sam Pollard
Marcello, una vita dolce by Annarosa Morri, Mario Canale

Restored prints

The 14 Amazons (Shi si nu ying hao) by Kang Cheng (1972)
Blast of Silence by Allen Baron (1961)
Cabiria by Giovanni Pastrone (1914)
Estate Violenta by Valerio Zurlini (1959)
The Hussy (La Drolesse) by Jacques Doillon (1978)
Harvest: 3,000 Years (Mirt Sost Shi Amit) by Haile Gerima (1975)
The Last Adventure (Les Aventuriers) by Robert Enrico (1967)
Monte Cristo by Henri Fescourt (1929)
Le mystère de la tour Eiffel by Julien Duvivier (1927)
Nausicaä of the Valley of the Wind (Kaze no Tani no Naushika) by Hayao Miyazaki (1984)
October: Ten Days That Shook the World (Oktyabr) by Sergei Eisenstein, Grigori Aleksandrov (1927)
Platoon by Oliver Stone (1986)
Rome, Open City (Roma città aperta) by Roberto Rossellini (1945)
The Searchers by John Ford (1956)
La Terra Trema by Luchino Visconti (1948)

Parallel sections

International Critics' Week
The following films were screened for the 45th International Critics' Week (45e Semaine de la Critique):

Feature film competition

Drama/Mex by Gerardo Naranjo (Mexico)
Fresh Air by Ágnes Kocsis (Hungary)
Komma by Martine Doyen (France, Belgium)
Les amitiés maléfiques by Emmanuel Bourdieu (France)
The Bothersome Man by Jens Lien (Norway)
Pingpong by Matthias Luthardt (Germany)
Sonhos de peixe by Kirill Mikhanovsky (Brazil)

Short film competition

Alguma coisa assim by Esmir Filho
Iron by Hiroyuki Nakano
Kristall by Christoph Girardet, Matthias Müller
Kvinna vid grammofon by Johannes Stjärne Nilsson, Ola Simonsson
L’écluse by Olivier Ciechelski
News by Ursula Ferrara
Printed Rainbow by Gitanjali Rao

Directors' Fortnight
The following films were screened for the 2006 Directors' Fortnight (Quinzaine des Réalizateurs): 

12:08 East of Bucharest by Corneliu Porumboiu (Romania)
Along the Ridge (Libero) by Kim Rossi Stuart (Italy)
Les Anges Exterminateurs by Jean-Claude Brisseau (France)
Azur et Asmar by Michel Ocelot (France)
Bug by William Friedkin (United States)
Ça brûle by Claire Simon (France)
Change of Address by Emmanuel Mouret (France)
Congorama by Philippe Falardeau (Canada)
Daft Punk's Electroma by Thomas Bangalter, Guy-Manuel de Homem-Christo (France)
Dans Paris by Christophe Honoré (France)
Day Night Day Night by Julia Loktev (United States, France, Germany)
The Hawk Is Dying by Julian Goldberger (United States)
Honor de Cavalleria by Albert Serra (Spain)
The Host by Bong Joon-ho (South Korea)
Jindabyne by Ray Lawrence (Australia)
Lying by M. Blash (United States)
Princesse by Anders Morgenthaler (Denmark)
Summer of '04 by Stefan Krohmer (Germany)
Sway by Miwa Nishikawa (Japan)
Transe by Teresa Villaverde (Italy, France)
The Way I Spent the End of the World by Catalin Mitulescu (Romania, France)
We Should Not Exist by Hervé P. Gustave (France)
White Palms by Szabolcs Hajdu (Hungary)

Short films

The Aluminum Fowl by James Clauer
Bugcrush by Carter Smith
By the Kiss by Yann Gonzalez
 by Cyprien Vial
 by Sophie Letourneur
Menged by Daniel Taye Workou
Rapace by João Nicolau
Un rat by Bosilka Simonovitch
 by Bin HajiSaari U-Wei
 by Frank Beauvais

Awards

Official awards
The following films and people received the 2006 Official selection awards:
Palme d'Or: The Wind That Shakes the Barley, by Ken Loach
Grand Prix: Flandres, by Bruno Dumont
Best Director Award: Alejandro González Iñárritu for Babel
Best Screenplay Award: Pedro Almodóvar for Volver
Best Actress: Chus Lampreave, Yohana Cobo, Carmen Maura, Lola Dueñas, Blanca Portillo, Penélope Cruz for their roles in Volver by Pedro Almodóvar
Best Actor: Jamel Debbouze, Samy Naceri, Sami Bouajila, Roschdy Zem, Bernard Blancan for their roles in Days of Glory (Indigènes) by Rachid Bouchareb
Prix du Jury: Red Road by Andrea Arnold
Un Certain Regard
Prix Un Certain Regard: Luxury Car by Wang Chao
Un Certain Regard Special Jury Prize: Ten Canoes by Rolf de Heer
Prix d’interprétation féminine: Dorotheea Petre in The Way I Spent the End of the World (Cum mi-am petrecut sfârşitul lumii)
Prix d’interprétation masculine: Ángel Tavira in The Violin (El violin)
Prix du Président du Jury Un Certain Regard: Meurtrières by Patrick Grandperret
Cinéfondation
First Prize: Ge & Zeta by Gustavo Riet
Second Prize: Mr. Schwartz, Mr. Hazen & Mr. Horlocker by Stefan Mueller
Third Prize: Mother by Siân Heder & Le virus by 
Golden Camera
Caméra d'Or: 12:08 East of Bucharest by Corneliu Porumboiu
Short films
Short Film Palme d'Or: Sniffer by Bobbie Peers
Jury Prize: Primera nieve by Pablo Aguero
Special Mention: Conte de quartier by Florence Miailhe

Independent awards
FIPRESCI Prizes
Climates by Nuri Bilge Ceylan (In competition)
Bug by William Friedkin (Directors' Fortnight)
Paraguayan Hammock (Hamaca paraguaya) by Paz Encina (Un Certain Regard)
Vulcan Award of the Technical Artist
Vulcan Award: Stephen Mirrione for editing Babel
Ecumenical Jury
Prize of the Ecumenical Jury: Babel by Alejandro González Iñárritu
 Prize of the Ecumenical Jury - Special Mention: Retrieval by Sławomir Fabicki
Award of the Youth
Bled Number One by Rabah Ameur-Zaïmeche
Awards in the frame of International Critics' Week
Grand prix de la semaine de la critique : Les amitiés maléfiques by Emmanuel Bourdieu
Prix SACD : Pingpong by Matthias Luthardt & Les amitiés maléfiques by Emmanuel Bourdieu
Prix Acid : The Bothersome Man by Jens Lien
Prix de la toute jeune critique : Pingpong by Matthias Luthardt
Grand Rail d'or : Les amitiés maléfiques by Emmanuel Bourdieu
Awards in the frame of Directors' Fortnight
Prix Art and Essay : Along the Ridge (Libero) by Kim Rossi Stuart
Prix Regard Jeune: Day Night Day Night by Julia Loktev
Label Europa Cinéma : 12:08 East of Bucharest by Corneliu Porumboiu
Prix SACD best french-language short: Dans le rang by Cyprien Vial
Prix Gras Savoye: Un rat by Bosilka Simonovitch
Association Prix François Chalais
Prix François Chalais: Days of Glory (Indigènes) by Rachid Bouchareb

References

Media
INA: List of winners of the 2006 Festival (commentary in French)

External links

2006 Cannes Film Festival (web.archive)
Official website Retrospective 2006 
Cannes Film Festival Awards for 2006 at Internet Movie Database

Cannes Film Festival
Cannes Film Festival
Cannes Film Festival
Cannes Film Festival
Cannes Film Festival
Cannes Film Festival